Mabroom (also spelled Mabroum or Mabrum) is a cultivar of the palm date that is widely grown in Saudi Arabia. It is a large, elongated date similar to the Piarom cultivar.

See also
List of date cultivars
Piarom

References

Date cultivars
Agriculture in Saudi Arabia